Jesper B. Jensen may refer to:

Jesper B. Monberg (born 1977), Danish speedway rider who was previously known as Jesper B. Jensen
Jesper Jensen (ice hockey, born 1991), Danish ice hockey defenceman who is also known as Jesper B. Jensen